The Ariane 4 was a European expendable space launch system, developed by the Centre national d'études spatiales (CNES), the French space agency, for the European Space Agency (ESA). It was manufactured by ArianeGroup and marketed by Arianespace. Since its first flight on 15 June 1988 until the final flight on 15 February 2003, it attained 113 successful launches out of 116 total launches.

In 1982, the Ariane 4 program was approved by ESA. Drawing heavily upon the preceding Ariane 3, it was designed to provide a launcher capable of delivering heavier payloads and at a lower cost per kilogram than the earlier members of the Ariane family. The Ariane 4 was principally an evolution of the existing technologies used, as opposed to being revolutionary in its design ethos; this approach quickly gained the backing of most ESA members, who funded and participated in its development and operation. Capable of being equipped with a wide variety of strap-on boosters, the Ariane 4 gained a reputation for being an extremely versatile launcher.

Once in service, the launcher soon became recognized for being ideal for launching communications and Earth observation satellites, as well as those used for scientific research. During its working life, the Ariane 4 managed to capture 50% of the market in launching commercial satellites, soundly demonstrating Europe's ability to compete in the commercial launch sector. In February 2003, the final Ariane 4 was launched; Arianespace had decided to retire the type in favour of the newer and larger Ariane 5, which effectively replaced it in service.

Development

Origins 
In 1973, eleven nations decided to pursue joint collaboration in the field of space exploration and formed a new pan-national organisation to undertake this mission, the European Space Agency (ESA). Six years later, in December 1979, the arrival of a capable European expendable launch system was marked when the first Ariane 1 launcher was successfully launched from the Centre Spatial Guyanais (CSG) at Kourou, French Guiana. The Ariane 1 soon became considered to be a capable and competitive launcher in comparison to rival platforms offered by the Soviet Union and the United States of America, and it was quickly followed by improved derivatives in the form of the Ariane 2 and Ariane 3. By early 1986, the Ariane 1, along with the Ariane 2 and Ariane 3, had become the dominant launcher on the world market.

In January 1982, the ESA issued its authorisation for the development and construction of the Ariane 4; the development programme had the stated objective of increasing the usable payload by 90%. The Ariane 4 would be a considerably larger and more flexible launcher that the earlier members of its family, being intended to compete with the upper end of launchers worldwide. Work on the Ariane 4 was substantially eased via drawing heavily on both the technology and experiences gained from producing and operating the earlier members of the Ariane rocket. The total development cost for the Ariane 4 was valued at 476 million European Currency Units (ECU) in 1986.

Posed with the requirement to produce a rocket with substantially greater thrust, the design team considered various approaches to achieve this. One concept studied had involved the addition of a fifth engine to an enlarged first stage of the Ariane 3, but was found to involve a very high level of redesign work to achieve this; instead, the first stage was elongated to hold  of propellant instead of the  present on the Ariane 3. While the second and third stages remained identical to the Ariane 3, a range of strap-on boosters were developed to be applied to the type, designed to gradually increase the rocket's payload capacity. Overall, the Ariane 4 was 15% smaller than the Ariane 3.

In effect, the Ariane 4 was an improved and developed derivative of the earlier Ariane 3, primarily differing through the application of various solid-fuelled and liquid-fuelled boosters, the latter being the only all-new design feature of the Ariane 4; at this point, the practice of using liquid boosters was uncommon, having only previously been used in the Chinese space program. Another innovation of the Ariane 4 was the dual-launch SPELDA (Structure Porteuse Externe de Lancement Double Ariane) fairing. This had the function of allowing a pair of satellites, one placed on top of the other; several different SPELDA nose fairings could be installed, including normal and extended models. The SPELDA was considerably lighter than its predecessor; the guidance system also used much more accurate ring laser gyroscopes. According to aviation author Brian Harvey, the advances present in the design of the Ariane 4 represented a conservative and evolutionary, rather than revolutionary, philosophy.

Teaming and construction 
As the Ariane 4 programme took shape, it gained the support of Belgium, Denmark, Spain, Ireland, Italy, the Netherlands, Germany, the United Kingdom, France, Sweden, and Switzerland. The main contractors were Aérospatiale (responsible for the first and second stages), Messerschmitt-Bölkow-Blohm (MBB) (produced the liquid-fuelled boosters), Société Européenne de Propulsion (SEP) (engine manufacturer), Matra (equipment bay assembly), Air Liquide (production of third stage tanks and insulation), BPD Snia (maker of solid-fuelled boosters), and British Aerospace/Contraves Space AG (manufacturers of the fairing). For their work on the Ariane 4, the Launch Team were subsequently awarded the Space Achievement Award by the Space Foundation in 2004.

In conjunction with the development of the Ariane 4 itself, a new purpose-built launch preparation area and launch pad for the rocket, collectively designated as ELA-2, was constructed at the Centre Spatial Guyanais to service the Ariane 4 and provide a launch rate of 8 launches per year (this feat was near-unprecedented for a single large rocket, other than within the Soviet Union). This railway provided the additional benefit of enabling faulty rockets to be withdrawn from the pad and be substituted for relatively quickly.

On 15 June 1988, the first successful launch of the Ariane 4 was conducted. For this first test flight, it was decided to fire the second most powerful version of the rocket, designated 44LP, equipped with four main engines, two solid boosters and two liquid boosters; it was also furnished with the multi-satellite SPELDA fairing. 50 seconds after take-off, the solid boosters would be expended and be detached in order to reduce the rocket's weight. 143 seconds after take-off, the liquid boosters also detached, further lightening the vehicle. The maiden flight was considered a success, putting multiple satellites into orbit.

Further development 
For the V50 launch onwards, an improved third stage, known as the H10+, was adopted for the Ariane 4.

Even prior to the first flight of the Ariane 4, development of a successor, designated as the Ariane 5, had already commenced. In January 1985, the Ariane 5 had been officially adopted as an ESA programme. Development of the Ariane 5 was not without controversy as some ESA members considered the more mature Ariane 4 to be more suited for meeting established needs for such launchers; it was for this reason that Britain chose not to participate in the Ariane 5 programme. For some years, Ariane 4 and Ariane 5 launchers were operated interchangeably; however, it was eventually decided to terminate all Ariane 4 operations in favour of concentrating on the newer Ariane 5.

Design 
The Ariane 4 was the ultimate development from the preceding members of the Ariane rocket family. Compared with the Ariane 2 and Ariane 3, the Ariane 4 featured a stretched first (by 61%) and third stages, a strengthened structure, new propulsion bay layouts, new avionics, and the SPELDA (Structure Porteuse Externe de Lancement Double Ariane) dual-payload carrier. The basic 40 version did not employ any strap-on motors, while the Ariane 42L, 44L, 42P, 44P, and 44LP variants all used various combinations of solid and liquid boosters. The Ariane 4 launcher reduced the launch costs per kilo by 55% in comparison to the original Ariane 1.

The rocket was used in a number of variants - it could be fitted with two or four additional solid (PAP for Propulseurs d'Appoint à Poudre) or liquid fueled booster rockets (PAL for Propulseurs d'Appoint à Liquide). The launcher included a satellite payload carrier system called SPELDA (Structure porteuse externe de lancement double Ariane, French for External Carrying Structure for Ariane Double Launches) for launching more than one satellite at a time. The rocket captured nearly 60% of the world's commercial launch services market, serving both European and international clients. Atop the third stage was a vehicle equipment stage which housed a computer that performed various functions, including sequencing, guidance, control, tracking, telemetry and an explosive-based self-destruct.

Main power was provided by four Viking 2B motors, each producing  of thrust. The second stage was powered by a single Viking 4B motor, and the third stage was equipped with an HM7-B liquid oxygen/liquid hydrogen motor.

Operational history 

In June 1988, the inaugural flight of the Ariane 4 occurred, which was a success.

On 22 February 1990, the first failure occurred during the eighth Ariane 4 launch, flight V36. The rocket exploded 9 km above Kourou. The failure occurred because a worker assembling a Viking rocket motor had left a handkerchief in one of the motor's coolant tubes. He had done so as a reminder to himself to inform his superior, as per procedure, of an unplanned polishing he had made to fit the tube. But he fell ill before he could do so and was replaced by other workers who did not notice the handkerchief. In flight, the handkerchief blocked the coolant tube, the motor overheated and failed, and the Ariane self-destructed after veering off its trajectory. Its payload, two communications satellites worth 500 million US dollars (Superbird-B and BS-2X) landed in pieces in the swamps near Kourou. The ensuing investigation recommended 44 modifications, including numbering and checking all pieces of cloth used in the rocket's assembly. The following 26 launches were all completed successfully.

The system became the basis for European satellite launches with a record of 113 successful and three launch failures.

On 15 February 2003, the final launch of Ariane 4 rocket occurred, placing Intelsat 907 into geosynchronous orbit. Arianespace had decided to phase out the Ariane 4 launcher in favour of the newer heavy-lift Ariane 5 rocket, which had already been in service for some years. In 2011, the medium-lift Soyuz ST complemented the offering of launch vehicles from the Centre Spatial Guyanais. Spacecraft launched by the Soyuz reused the payload platform and dispenser which had been originally designed for the Ariane.

Comparable rockets 
 Delta II (retired)
 GSLV Mk II
 GSLV Mk III
 Long March 3B
 Soyuz-U (retired)

See also 

 Comparison of orbital launchers families
 Tsyklon-4 (Ukrainian carrier rocket with fairing derived from Ariane 4)

References

Bibliography 

 Harvey, Brian. Europe's Space Programme: To Ariane and Beyond. Springer Science & Business Media, 2003

External links 

 ESA Ariane 4 launchers
 FAS Ariane 4 
 A cutaway drawing of the Ariane 4

Ariane (rocket family)
Vehicles introduced in 1988